Shropshire Council is the local authority of Shropshire, in England, comprising the ceremonial county of Shropshire except Telford and Wrekin. It is a unitary authority, having the powers of a non-metropolitan county and district council combined.

It replaced the former two-tier local government structure in the non-metropolitan county of Shropshire on 1 April 2009, which involved its immediate predecessor, Shropshire County Council, and five non-metropolitan district councils – Bridgnorth District Council, North Shropshire District Council, Oswestry Borough Council, Shrewsbury and Atcham Borough Council and South Shropshire District Council. These districts and their councils were abolished in the reorganisation.

The remainder of the county is covered by Telford and Wrekin Council, which was established as a unitary authority in 1998. Shropshire is located in the West Midlands region of England, on the border with Wales.

The council's seat is at Shirehall in Shrewsbury, the largest town (with a population of 70,600) in the unitary authority's area and historic county town of Shropshire. The council, however, has numerous offices across the county and area committees meet in the former district headquarters at Oswestry, Wem, Ludlow and Bridgnorth. The area covered by Shropshire Council is rural, with the second largest town being Oswestry with a population of just 16,600. Prior to the 2009 reorganisation, Shropshire was the least populated two-tier area in England.

History
Shropshire Council came into being when the area for which Shropshire County Council was previously responsible for converted to unitary status. The replacement of the two-tier system, which had been established in 1974, of five district councils and one county council, was part of the 2009 structural changes to local government in England. The county council became the continuing authority, though the change to unitary status led to the council dropping the word "County" from its title. Similar conversions occurred in 2009 in Cornwall, Wiltshire, County Durham and Northumberland.

The logo for Shropshire Council is the former county council coat of arms with "Shropshire Council" written to the side, in white and blue.

Background

In 2006 a local government white paper supported proposals for new unitary authorities to be set up in England in certain areas. Existing non-metropolitan counties with small populations, such as Cornwall, Northumberland and Shropshire, were favoured by the government to be covered by unitary authorities in one form or another (the county either becoming a single unitary authority or be broken into a number of unitary authorities). For the counties in the 2009 reorganisation, existing unitary authority areas within the counties' ceremonial boundaries (such as Telford and Wrekin) were not to be affected and no boundary changes were planned.

Shropshire County Council, supported by South Shropshire District Council and Oswestry Borough Council, proposed to the government that the non-metropolitan county of Shropshire become a single unitary authority. This was opposed by the other 3 districts in the county, with Shrewsbury & Atcham Borough Council taking their objection to the High Court in a judicial review.

The proposal to create a Shropshire unitary authority, covering the area of the existing non-metropolitan county, was supported by the DCLG and 1 April 2009 was set as the date for the re-organisation to take place. The first elections to Shropshire Council did not take place however until 4 June 2009 (the councillors of Shropshire County Council became the councillors of the new Shropshire Council in the interim period).

The new council inherited almost all of the properties and assets of the former district councils and county council (some assets were handed to the newly established Shrewsbury Town Council).

The council

The council, which is elected in full every four years, consists of 74 councillors from 53 single-member electoral divisions, nine 2-member divisions and one 3-member electoral division. In most instances the electoral division boundaries follow civil parish boundary lines, with the main exceptions being in the larger towns, where the parish contains more than one electoral division. Shrewsbury for example, which was parished in 2008 as part of the change in local governance, contains 16 electoral divisions, one of which is the sole 3-member division that also encompasses the parish of Bayston Hill.

Main positions
The council has two major positions to which councillors may be appointed:

Chairman – the ceremonial head of the council who also chairs meetings of the full council
Leader – the leader of the controlling political group

The Leader and nine additional portfolio holders form the Cabinet. This is effectively the executive branch of the authority.

Elections
Shropshire Council elections (including results of by-elections)
2009 Shropshire Council election
2013 Shropshire Council election
2017 Shropshire Council election
2021 Shropshire Council election

The 2017 election resulted in the election of 49 Conservative, 12 Liberal Democrat, 8 Labour and 5 others giving a Conservative majority of 24.

|-
| 
| Federalist Party of the United Kingdom
| align="right"| 
| align="right"| 
| align="right"| 
| align="right"| 
| align="right"| 
| align="right"| 0.1
| align="right"| 79 
| align="right"| 
|-

Administration
The permanent head of the administration of the council is the chief executive. The employees of the council are structured within services, which are themselves structured as part of directorates, each of which is headed by a permanent member of staff. There are two corporate directors – that for people and another for places, with a further three area directors, for the county's geographical subdivisions. Beneath director level there are a number of group managers, who oversee the councils individual service managers. It is the service managers who then oversee much of the council's day to day administrative functions and, with the help of their officers, provide its frontline services. Currently the service managers at Shropshire Council have responsibility for policy areas such as Shared Services, Planning and Education.

The council employs around 6,500 staff, of which around 900 are based at their main Shirehall site. Further sites used by the council are spread across the county and include, amongst others, the Guildhall in Shrewsbury and former district council properties in lesser market towns such as Bridgnorth, Wem, Oswestry and Ludlow. With major reductions in staff numbers in recent years, a re-organisation is taking place, which will see the eventual closure of the Shirehall and other local moves including planning staff moved from Ludlow to Craven Arms. The former offices of South Shropshire District Council in Ludlow (Stone House on Corve Street) closed in 2014.

Sub-divisions

The area covered by the unitary authority is sub-divided into 63 electoral divisions, which are equivalent to wards. Shropshire Council established three area planning committees which deal with town and country planning matters. Originally other functions were planned to be dealt with by the committees, including licensing, but these plans never came to fruition. The area planning committees cover a geographical area based on the former (pre-2009 reform) districts of Shropshire and which consist of electoral divisions with a combined representation of 24 or 25 councillors. The councillors who represent an area's electoral divisions then form the area planning committee for that area.

The area planning committee setup is similar to the arrangements at the neighbouring Powys County Council, where the area covered is sub-divided into three areas, which were the previous (pre-merger) administrative divisions, namely the Counties of Radnorshire, Brecknockshire and Montgomeryshire. The areas also correspond to the Westminster Parliament constituencies of Shropshire, with the North and Central areas being exactly coextensive with constituencies.

Committee meetings in the North and South areas did rotate between two meeting places in each of these areas, which were the headquarters of the former district councils, from 2009 to 2013. The Central area had just one meeting location, Shirehall, though some staff are at The Guildhall in Shrewsbury, which was the headquarters of the former borough council. Since 2013 all meetings take place at Shrewsbury's Shirehall.

The county is entirely parished, with the formerly unparished area of Shrewsbury having been parished in 2008, with a single parish covering the town. Most parishes have a parish council, with the towns having a town council (with a mayor chairing), and some less populated parishes having parish meetings instead of a council.

28 "local joint committees" exist, which consist of councillors from both Shropshire Council and the parish council(s) for the locality they cover (often a market town and its hinterland, or a part of Shrewsbury). These committees deal with a variety of very local matters.

See also
Parliamentary constituencies in Shropshire
Flag of Shropshire

Notes

References

External links

English unitary authorities created in 2009
Unitary authority councils of England
Leader and cabinet executives
Local education authorities in England
Local authorities in Shropshire
Billing authorities in England